Yerkinkala (Yerkinkala, ەركينكالا) is a town in Atyrau Region, western Kazakhstan,  southwest of the regional capital of Atyrau.

References

Atyrau Region
Cities and towns in Kazakhstan